Dichostates trifasciculatus is a species of beetle in the family Cerambycidae. It was described by Teocchi, Jiroux and Sudre in 2004.

References

Crossotini
Beetles described in 2004